Caryocolum tischeriella  (Zeller, 1839) is a moth of the family Gelechiidae. It is found in Portugal, Spain, France, Germany, Austria, Switzerland, Italy, the Czech Republic, Slovakia, Slovenia, Croatia, former Yugoslavia, Romania, Bulgaria, North Macedonia, Greece, Norway, Finland, the Baltic region and Russia, as well as on Crete and Sicily. Outside of Europe, it is found in southern Siberia, Central Asia and North Africa.

The length of the forewings is 5–6 mm. The forewings are blackish brown with distinct white markings. Adults have been recorded on wing from mid-June to late August.

The larvae feed on Silene nutans. They feed from between two spun leaves, eating the inner surface of the leaves. Larvae can be found from early May to late June. After overwintering, pupation takes place on the ground.

See also 
 fischerella-group
 Caryocolum fischerella (Treitschke, 1833)
 alsinella-group
 Caryocolum albifaciella (Heinemann, 1870)
 Caryocolum alsinella (Zeller, 1868)
 Caryocolum viscariella (Stainton, 1855)
 Caryocolum vicinella (Douglas, 1851) 
 Caryocolum bosalella (Rebel, 1936)
 Caryocolum anatolicum Huemer, 1989
 sciurella-group
 Caryocolum sciurella (Walsingham, 1908)
 nepalense-group
 Caryocolum nepalense Povolny, 1968
 Caryocolum longiusculum Huemer, 1988
 Caryocolum vartianorum Huemer, 1988
 tetrameris-group
 Caryocolum tetrameris (Meyrick, 1926)
 Caryocolum paghmanum Huemer, 1988
 mongolense-group
 Caryocolum mongolense Povolny, 1969
 amaurella-group
 Caryocolum amaurella (Hering, 1924)
 Caryocolum crypticum Huemer, Karsholt & Mutanen, 2014
 Caryocolum iranicum Huemer, 1989
 oculatella-group
 Caryocolum oculatella (Thomann, 1930)
 petryi-group
 Caryocolum petryi (Hofmann, 1899)
 Caryocolum afghanum Huemer, 1988
 Caryocolum majus Huemer, 1988
 Caryocolum splendens Povolny, 1977
 Caryocolum dilatatum Huemer, 1989
 Caryocolum spinosum Huemer, 1989
 saginella-group
 Caryocolum inflativorella (Klimesch, 1938)
 Caryocolum saginella (Zeller, 1868) 
 Caryocolum cauligenella (Schmid, 1863)
 trauniella-group
 Caryocolum trauniella (Zeller, 1868)
 Caryocolum peregrinella (Herrich-Schaffer, 1854)
 Caryocolum delphinatella (Constant, 1890)
 provinciella-group
 Caryocolum provinciella (Stainton, 1869) 
 mucronatella-group
 Caryocolum mucronatella (Chretien, 1900) 
 Caryocolum simulans Huemer, 1988
 leucomelanella-group
 Caryocolum abhorrens Huemer, 1988
 Caryocolum leucomelanella (Zeller, 1839) 
 Caryocolum immixtum Huemer, 1988
 Caryocolum leucothoracellum (Klimesch, 1953) 
 Caryocolum schleichi (Christoph, 1872)
 Caryocolum albithoracellum Huemer, 1989
 Caryocolum similellum Huemer, 1989
 marmoreum-group
 Caryocolum marmoreum (Haworth, 1828)
 Caryocolum pullatella (Tengstrom, 1848) 
 Caryocolum protectum (Braun, 1965) 
 stramentella-group
 Caryocolum stramentella (Rebel, 1935)
 fraternella-group
 Caryocolum hispanicum Huemer, 1988
 Caryocolum confluens Huemer, 1988
 Caryocolum fraternella (Douglas, 1851) 
 interalbicella-group
 Caryocolum klosi (Rebel, 1917)
 Caryocolum interalbicella (Herrich-Schaffer, 1854)
 Caryocolum laceratella (Zeller, 1868)
 Caryocolum nearcticum Huemer, 1988
 Caryocolum blandella (Douglas, 1852) 
 Caryocolum blandelloides Karsholt, 1981
 Caryocolum horoscopa (Meyrick, 1926)
 Caryocolum jaspidella (Chretien, 1908)
 Caryocolum proximum (Haworth, 1828)
 Caryocolum blandulella (Tutt, 1887)
 Caryocolum tricolorella (Haworth, 1812)
 Caryocolum fibigerium Huemer, 1988
 Caryocolum junctella (Douglas, 1851)
 Caryocolum kasyi Huemer, 1988
 Caryocolum transiens Huemer, 1992
 extremum-group
 Caryocolum extremum Huemer, 1988
 cassella-group
 Caryocolum cassella (Walker, 1864)
 huebneri-group
 Caryocolum moehringiae (Klimesch, 1954)
 Caryocolum petrophilum (Preissecker, 1914)
 Caryocolum huebneri (Haworth, 1828)
 Caryocolum kroesmanniella (Herrich-Schaffer, 1854)
 unknown group
 Caryocolum arenbergeri Huemer, 1989
 Caryocolum baischi Huemer & Karsholt, 2010
 Caryocolum dauphini Grange & Nel, 2012
 Caryocolum divergens Huemer, 1989
 Caryocolum gallagenellum Huemer, 1989
 Caryocolum leucofasciatum Huemer, 1989
 Caryocolum mazeli Huemer & Nel, 2005
 Caryocolum repentis Huemer & Luquet, 1992
 Caryocolum siculum Bella, 2008
 Caryocolum srnkai Huemer & Karsholt, 201

References

Moths described in 1839
tischeriella
Moths of Europe
Moths of Asia
Moths of Africa